North Perth may refer to:

North Perth, Ontario, Canada
North Perth, Western Australia